Muhammad Baydoun (5 February 1952 – 17 May 2022) was a moderate Lebanese politician and served as a member of the Lebanese parliament from 1992 until 2005. He also served as minister of power and energy as recently as 2005. He participated in many rallies organized by the 14 March coalition.

Early life and education
Baydoun was born into a Shiite family in Bachoura, Beirut, on 5 February 1952. His family were originally from Bint Jbeil in South Lebanon. Baydoun held a bachelor of science degree in mathematics from Lebanese University and a PhD in mathematics from Claude Bernard University in Lyon, France.

Career
Baydoun worked as mathematics professor at Lebanese University from 1976 to 1988. In 1980, he became a senior official of the Amal Movement. He was named a member of Amal's political bureau in 1982 and appointed president of the bureau on 14 October 1998. Baydoun is also former president of Amal's council of the south (1985-1991). In 1991, he was appointed deputy from Amal and elected in the general election in 1992 and general election in 1996 for the Shi’ite seat in Tyre, South Lebanon. He also won his seat in the general election in 2000 receiving more votes than Hezbollah candidates.

Baydoun also served as government minister in different cabinets. He was first appointed minister of housing and cooperatives in Omar Karami's government. He served in this post from 24 December 1990 to 10 May 1992. Then, he was appointed minister of electrical and water resources in Rachid Al Solh's cabinet, and was in office from 16 May 1992 to 30 October 1992. He also served in the cabinet led by Prime Minister Salim Hoss from 1998 to 2000. Baydoun was appointed minister of electrical and water resources to the cabinet led by Prime Minister Rafik Hariri in October 2000. Baydoun was expelled by Nabih Berri, head of the Amal movement, from the cabinet in March 2003.

In October 2012, Baydoun declared that he was ready to become Parliament speaker if his candidacy was backed by the March 14 Coalition.

Baydoun had also business activities and was a member of the board and of the audit committee of the İBL Bank.

Views and influence
At the beginning of the 2000s, Baydoun was a pro-Syrian politician, who had close ties with "old guards" in Damascus such as Hikmat Shihabi and Abdul Halim Khaddam. In June 2008, Baydoun stated that Saad Hariri was unable to organize the Sunni community or defend it and to build the institutions of state.

The Shiite community of Lebanon has been dominated by a number of feudal families. Although Baydoun was not part of these families, he was among the individuals who has influence on the Shiite community.

Death
Baydoun died on 17 May 2022 due to an undisclosed illness.

References

20th-century Lebanese businesspeople
21st-century Lebanese businesspeople
1952 births
2022 deaths
Amal Movement politicians
Energy ministers of Lebanon
Housing ministers of Lebanon
Water ministers of Lebanon
Lebanese Shia Muslims
Lebanese University alumni
Academic staff of Lebanese University
Members of the Parliament of Lebanon
Politicians from Beirut
University of Lyon alumni